The second USS Fortune (IX-146) was built in 1921 by Doulett and Williams, New Orleans, La., as City of Elwood; acquired by the Navy 16 February 1944; and commissioned 19 February 1944. She was reclassified AVS-2 on 25 May 1945.

Commissioned at Pearl Harbor, Fortune sailed 16 May 1944 for Kwajalein, her base for cargo operations to Eniwetok, Manus, and Ulithi until 10 January 1945, when she became fleet issue ship at Ulithi. She sailed from Ulithi 24 April with passengers for Alameda, California, arriving 20 May, and lay in various California shipyards until decommissioned 18 October 1945 and transferred to the War Shipping Administration the same day.

References 

 

Design 1037 ships of the United States Navy
Ships built in New Orleans
1921 ships
Unclassified miscellaneous vessels of the United States Navy
World War II auxiliary ships of the United States